The 2013 UConn Huskies football team represented the University of Connecticut in the 2013 NCAA Division I FBS football season as a member of the American Athletic Conference. They were led by third year head coach Paul Pasqualoni for the first four games then interim head coach T. J. Weist for the rest of the season. They played their home games at Rentschler Field.

After starting the year 0–4 and going 10–18 since being hired in 2011, head coach Paul Pasqualoni was fired on September 30.

They finished the season 3–9, 3–5 in American Athletic play to finish in a tie for sixth place.

Schedule

Game summaries

Towson

Maryland

Michigan

@ Buffalo

South Florida

@ Cincinnati

@ UCF

Louisville

@ SMU

@ Temple

Rutgers

Memphis

References

UConn
UConn Huskies football seasons
UConn Huskies football